Liu Yongqing (born 3 October 1940), is the wife of Hu Jintao, the former General Secretary of the Chinese Communist Party and President of the People’s Republic of China. Traditionally, Liu Yongqing’s role would be primarily domestic, but Liu often accompanied her husband on his official trips to foreign countries and made personal appearances at charities and cultural institutions all over the world.

Biography
Liu Yongqing was born in 1940 in Chongqing and attended Bashu High School. She met her husband at Tsinghua University in Beijing. Later she worked for Beijing's city planning committee. As with her husband, Liu's life and background are not widely known among foreign observers. She received virtually no public attention before Hu Jintao's leadership. Hu himself has preferred to stay out of the public eye and tended to avoid publicity during his political career.

Children
Hu Jintao and Liu Yongqing have two grown children – a son named Hu Haifeng and a daughter named Hu Haiqing, both of whom were educated at the Tsinghua University. Haifeng is a businessman. Haiqing was married in 2003, at the age of 33, to Mao Daolin.

References

1940 births
Living people
Hu Jintao family
Tsinghua University alumni
Spouses of national leaders
Place of birth missing (living people)